The 1989 AAA Championships was an outdoor track and field competition organised by the Amateur Athletic Association (AAA), held from 11 to 13 August at Alexander Stadium in Birmingham, England. It was considered the de facto national championships for the United Kingdom, ahead of the 1989 UK Athletics Championships.

The men's decathlon and women's heptathlon, 5000 metres and 10,000 metres events were hosted in Stoke-on-Trent. The women's triple jump was held in Middlesbrough and the women's 10 km road walk was held in Leeds.

Medal summary

Men

Women

References

AAA Championships
AAA Championships
Athletics Outdoor
AAA Championships
Sports competitions in Birmingham, West Midlands
Athletics competitions in England